Larry Young may refer to:

 Larry Young (musician) (1940–1978), jazz organist
 Larry Young (umpire) (born 1954), baseball umpire
 Larry Young (racewalker) (born 1943), Olympic racewalker
 Larry Young, one of the many alter egos of the Marvel Comics anti-hero Deathlok
 Larry Young, former President and CEO of Dr Pepper Snapple Group
 Larry Young (politician) (born 1949), former Maryland State Senator
 Larry J. Young, American psychiatrist